

Siegfried Rasp (10 January 1898 – 2 February 1968) was a general in the Wehrmacht of Nazi Germany during World War II.

Awards and decorations
 Knight's Cross of the Iron Cross on 15 April 1944 as Generalmajor and commander of 335th Infantry Division

References

Citations

Bibliography

 

1898 births
1968 deaths
Military personnel from Munich
People from the Kingdom of Bavaria
German Army generals of World War II
Generals of Infantry (Wehrmacht)
Recipients of the Gold German Cross
Recipients of the Knight's Cross of the Iron Cross
German Army personnel of World War I
Reichswehr personnel